Methylornithine synthase (PylB) is an enzyme with systematic name L-lysine carboxy-aminomethylmutase. This enzyme catalyses the conversion of L-lysine into (3R)-3-methyl-D-ornithine.

The enzyme is a member of the superfamily of S-adenosyl-L-methionine-dependent radical enzymes.

References

External links 
 

EC 5.4.99